Ptahmose or Ptahmes may refer to:
 Ptahmose I (High Priest of Ptah), during the time of Thutmose III
 Ptahmose II (High Priest of Ptah), during the time of Thutmose IV
 Ptahmose, son of Menkheper, High Priest of Ptah in Memphis during the time of Thutmose IV and/or Amenhotep III
 Ptahmose, son of Thutmose, High Priest of Ptah in Memphis during the time of Thutmose IV and/or Amenhotep III
 Ptahmose (vizier), High Priest of Amun and Vizier of Upper Egypt, under Amenhotep III
 Ptahmose (treasurer), under Amenhotep III
 Ptahmose, an official under Ramesses II, known for his tomb (see Tomb of Ptahmes)

Ancient Egyptian given names
Theophoric names